At the 1952 Summer Olympics in Helsinki, two events in modern pentathlon were contested.  For the first time, a team event was part of the Olympic program.

Medalists

Medal table

Participating nations

A total of 51 athletes from 19 nations competed at the Helsinki Games:

References

External links
 

 
1952 Summer Olympics events
1952